Fountain Lakes may refer to:

Fountain Valley (British Columbia), also known as the Fountain Lakes Valley or Three Lakes Valley, a valley and associated rural community near Lillooet, British Columbia, Canada
the fictional community of Fountain Lakes in the Australian television series Kath & Kim.